Miroslav Šindelka (born 27 June 1963 in Czechoslovakia) is a Slovak director, writer and producer . In 1996, he founded the production company "Film Factory".

Filmography

Music videos
Hex, "Votrelec"
Richard Müller
Robo Grogorov
Free Faces
Bez ladu a skladu

References

General
 
 
Specific

External links 
 

1963 births
Living people
Film people from Bratislava
Slovak film directors
Slovak film producers